Hector ("Hec") Monroe Dyer (June 2, 1910 – May 19, 1990) was an American athlete, winner of a gold medal in 4 × 100 m relay at the 1932 Summer Olympics.

During the 1932 Olympic trials, Dyer tied the world record of 10.4 in the 100-meter dash. He also beat the Olympic record in the 200-meter dash. At the 1932 Summer Olympics, held in Los Angeles, he ran the third leg in the American 4 × 100 m relay team, which won the gold medal with a new world record of 40.0.

In later years, Dyer worked in the oil business. He died in 1990 in Fullerton, California, aged 79. He was the grandson of William Newton Monroe.

References

1910 births
1990 deaths
American male sprinters
Athletes (track and field) at the 1932 Summer Olympics
Olympic gold medalists for the United States in track and field
Sportspeople from Fullerton, California
Stanford Cardinal men's track and field athletes
Medalists at the 1932 Summer Olympics